Lone Target, released in the USA as Manhunt, is an American television series produced by Discovery Studios. The show follows ex-Navy SEAL Joel Lambert as he attempts to evade mock manhunts organized by various law enforcement and military units around the world.

Production 

Each episode pits Lambert against a different law enforcement or military unit (dubbed the "Hunter Force Unit"), in the location where it usually operates; both sides are aware of each other as this is treated as a training exercise. He is dropped off some distance from the designated extraction point with a basic survival kit, together with a cameraman and sometimes a warn dog.  Once the Hunter Unit discovers an infiltration within their borders; the exercise begins and Joel must then covertly make his way to the extraction point within a limited amount of time, while avoiding his pursuers, who are tasked with finding and capturing him; simultaneously dealing with mother nature, as well as other unexpected events. A separate camera crew follows the pursuing unit.

Episodes

References

External links 
 
 

2014 American television series debuts
Discovery Channel original programming
2010s American reality television series
2015 American television series endings